Pterulone is a fungal metabolite. It was initially isolated from the mycelium and liquid cultures of wood-decay fungus in the genus Pterula. The compound inhibits eukaryotic respiration by targeting the mitochondrial NADH:ubiquinone oxidoreductase.

References 

Fungicides
Halogen-containing natural products
Heterocyclic compounds with 2 rings
Oxepines
Ketones